MAIET Entertainment was a South Korean video game developer, best known for creating the third-person shooter game GunZ: The Duel in 2004. They also developed GunZ 2 in 2011 and adapted it into English in 2013.

Etymology
According to the official site, MAIET is 'TEAM' spelled backwards with the letter 'I' added in, standing for 'innovation'.

History
The company started out as a small group of four researchers which eventually grew into a company. In 2015 MAIET was dissolved, giving gaming rights to Masangsoft Inc.(마상소프트)

Products
GunZ: The Duel has servers in Korea, and has all evolved from the original International server in many ways, such as having "cash items". MAIET's first developed video game was the aerial strategy game AceSaga, which was terminated.

References

External links
Official Website
Official Blog
Old korean maiet website from 2006
Ijji
 
Defunct video game companies of South Korea